Tarabya I of Pakhan (also known as Tarabya the Elder of Pakhan, ပုခန်း တရဖျားကြီး,) was a Burmese governor and military commander during the early Ava period. Between 1390 and 1413, Tarabya served as governor of Pakhan and as an officer in the Ava military in several campaigns, mostly against the southern Hanthawaddy forces in the Forty Years' War. In 1413, he lost his military command and was transferred to become governor of Pagan (Bagan), the ancient royal capital. He appeared to have ended his career there .

Tarabya is remembered in Burmese history for his progeny. He was the father of Queen Saw Min Hla of Ava and her younger brother Viceroy Tarabya of Toungoo; the maternal grandfather of the self-proclaimed king Minye Kyawhtin of Toungoo and King Min Hla of Ava; and the paternal grandfather of Viceroy Minkhaung I of Toungoo. He is the earliest known patrilineal ancestor of King Bayinnaung of the Toungoo dynasty. All the kings of the dynasty—Mingyi Nyo, Tabinshwehti and Bayinnaung onwards—claimed descent from Tarabya.

Brief

The first explicitly dated mention of him in the royal chronicles is in 1390–1391 when he commanded an Ava regiment  that fought in the battle of Gu-Htut in the Forty Years' War under the command of King Swa Saw Ke (r. 1367–1400). He was then already governor of Pakhan (modern Pakokku District in central Myanmar), and would hold the post until 1413. Outside of his reappointment to the post in 1402 by King Minkhaung I (r. 1400–1421), chronicles say nothing about his record as governor of the vassal state. 

In all, only his military record can be gleaned from the chronicles, and it was not particularly distinguished. Though a regimental commander, Tarabya appeared to have gained a minor advisory role in the Ava high command, especially after his daughter Saw Min Hla wedded Crown Prince Minye Kyawswa in 1406. In 1408, he and Gov. Sithu of Yamethin were a voice of caution, urging the king not to invade Hanthawaddy right before the start of the rainy season. But the king ignored their advice, and proceeded to invade the southern kingdom. The invasion ended in total disarray three months later; Tarabya was one of the commanders in the rearguard army that failed to secure an orderly withdrawal.

His last campaign was in 1412–1413 when he failed two assignments. First, early in the campaign  November 1412, his regiment failed to capture a key Hanthawaddy stockade, defended by Commander Smin Upakaung, blocking the route to the besieged city of Prome (Pyay). Later, in May 1413, Tarabya failed to defend the key port city of Syriam (Thanlyin), which had been captured by Crown Prince Minye Kyawswa with great difficulty just a few weeks earlier. With Minye Kyawswa pressing ahead towards the Hanthawaddy capital Pegu (Bago), Tarabya became "careless", and was unprepared when a Hanthawaddy flotilla launched a counterattack on the port. The loss of Syriam frustrated the Ava crown prince's plans to occupy the Irrawaddy delta over the rainy season (June–October), and forced him to pull back to Prome.

Back at Ava (Inwa), Tarabya, the father-in-law of the crown prince, escaped harsh punishment. King Minkhaung transferred Tarabya to become governor of Pagan, and appointed his youngest son Prince Minye Kyawhtin to take over Pakhan. His posting at Pagan (Bagan), the ancient capital, may have been a face-saving measure, as Tarabya never went to the front again as an active commander. (He did briefly return to Pakhan in 1426 with the army of Mohnyin Thado against Prince Minye Kyawhtin but not as a commander.)

Tarabya lived out his years at Pagan. He survived the unrest and civil war that ensued after the twin assassinations of his son-in-law King Thihathu (r. 1421–1425), and grandson King Min Hla (r. 1425) in 1425. He supported Thado, who overthrew King Min Nyo in 1426. It is unclear when he died. Chronicle reporting suggests that he likely died sometime during Thado's reign (1426–1439), and probably before early 1434. The Yazawin Thit chronicle states that Princess Einda Thiri succeeded the governorship at Pagan (at an unspecified date during the king's reign), meaning that Tarabya was no longer governor of Pagan sometime between 1426 and 1439, either because he had died or was replaced. Furthermore, he had apparently died by early 1434 since the king appointed Tarabya's son governor of Amyint with the title of Tarabya  February 1434.

Family

Tarabya is remembered for his progeny. According to the chronicles, he had at least two children: Queen Saw Min Hla of Ava (r. 1421–1425) and her younger brother Viceroy Tarabya of Toungoo (r. 1440–1446). He was the maternal grandfather of the self-proclaimed king Minye Kyawhtin of Toungoo (r. 1452–1459) and King Min Hla of Ava (r. 1425) as well as the paternal grandfather of Viceroy Minkhaung I of Toungoo (r. 1446–1452).

Through Saw Min Hla, he was an ancestor of kings Mingyi Nyo and Tabinshwehti of the Toungoo Dynasty. Through Minkhaung I of Toungoo, the royal chronicles from the 18th century onwards trace the patrilineal ancestry of King Bayinnaung (r. 1550–1581) of the Toungoo Dynasty. According to the genealogy of the king first proclaimed in the chronicle Maha Yazawin in 1724, Tarabya is the earliest known patrilineal ancestor of Bayinnaung and all the subsequent kings of the dynasty. While Bayinnaung's maternal line traces back ultimately to the monarchs of Pagan (to the first millennium CE), the paternal line ends with Tarabya I of Pakhan in the 14th century. Given that his daughter was married to two crown princes and later became of the chief queen consort, and that he himself was made governor of the ancient royal capital of Pagan, Tarabya may likely have hailed from a not-too-distant branch of the royal family. Still, chronicles could not provide any information about Tarabya's ancestry.

Military service
The following is a list of the military campaigns Tarabya I of Pakhan participated in as explicitly reported in the chronicles. Chronicles do include a "lord of Pakhan" in the order of battle lists for the first two campaigns of the Forty Years' War (1385–1386, and 1386–1387) but do not provide the name of the lord.

Notes

References

Bibliography
 
 
 
 
 
 

Ava dynasty
1430s deaths